Gerhard Seibold (born 13 May 1943) was an Austrian sprint canoeist who competed from the late 1960s to the early 1970s. Competing in two Summer Olympics, he won a bronze in the K-2 1000 m event at Mexico City in 1968.

Seibold also won four medals at the ICF Canoe Sprint World Championships with a gold (K-2 1000 m: 1970), two silvers (K-2 1000 m: 1971, K-4 1000 m: 1966), and a bronze (K-2 500 m: 1970).

Biography 
Gerhard Seibold was born on 13 May 1943 in Klosterneuburg.

The first serious success at the adult international level was achieved in 1966, when he was included in the main squad of the Austrian national team and visited the World Championships in East Berlin, from where he brought the silver medal, won in the four-man kayak competition at a distance of 1000 meters. A year later, he competed at the European Championships in Duisburg, West Germany, where he won the bronze medal among the fours in the ten kilometers.

Thanks to a series of successful performances he has got the right to protect honor of the country at the summer Olympics 1968 in Mexico city — in twos on a thousand metres along with partner Günther Pfaff won in the final the third place, having conceded only to teams from the USSR and Hungary, and thus won the bronze medal, while in the four-man competition which in addition to Pfaff also includes rowers Helmut Hediger and Kurt Lindegren showed in the finals only the seventh result.

After becoming an Olympic bronze medalist, Seibold remained in the main part of the Austrian rowing team and continued to take part in major international regattas. So, in 1970, he went to represent the country at the World Championship in Copenhagen, where, together with the same Günter Pfaff, he twice rose to the podium: he received bronze in the five-hundred-meter double and gold in the thousand-meter double. The following season, at the World Championships in Belgrade, Yugoslavia, he tried to defend the title of champion in the kilometer discipline of two-man kayaks, but this time he and Pfaff finished second and had to settle for silver awards — they were ahead of the German crew of Rainer Kurt and Alexander Slatnov.

As one of the leaders of the Austrian national team, Gerhard Seibold successfully qualified for the 1972 Olympic Games in Munich-he competed here only in the fours in the thousand meters, and his partners were Kurt Heubusch, Heinz Rodinger and Alfred Zechmeister — as a result, they could not qualify for the preliminary stage, and in the consolation race they finished only fifth.

For outstanding sporting achievements in 1996, Seibold was awarded the badge of the First degree of the Honorary Badge "For Services to the Republic of Austria".

Notes

References

Links

1943 births
Austrian male canoeists
Canoeists at the 1968 Summer Olympics
Canoeists at the 1972 Summer Olympics
Living people
Olympic canoeists of Austria
Olympic bronze medalists for Austria
Olympic medalists in canoeing
ICF Canoe Sprint World Championships medalists in kayak
Medalists at the 1968 Summer Olympics
People from Klosterneuburg
Sportspeople from Lower Austria